Jinkins is a surname. It is similar to Jinkinson, Jenkins and Jenkyns.

List of people with the surname 

 Jim Jinkins (born 1953), American animator, cartoonist, children's author and creator of the animated Doug television series
 Laurie Jinkins (born 1964), American politician

See also 

 Jinkies

English-language surnames
Surnames of English origin
Surnames of British Isles origin